Mountainburg School District 16 (MSD) is a public school district based in Mountainburg, Arkansas. MPSD encompasses  of land in Crawford County and serves all or portions of the communities of Mountain Pine, Winslow, Mulberry, Chester, Alma and Rudy.

The school district and its schools located along U.S. Route 71 serves more than 700 students with more than 120 faculty and staff at its three schools. The district and schools' mascot is the Dragon with royal blue and white serving as the colors.

Schools 
 Mountainburg High School, serving more than 275 students in grades 9  through 12.
 Mountainburg Middle School, serving more than 325 students in grades 5 through grade 8.
 Mountainburg Elementary School, serving more than 325 students in prekindergarten through grade 6.

References

External links
 

Education in Crawford County, Arkansas
School districts in Arkansas